The California Surf Museum is a museum located at 312 Pier View Way  in Oceanside, California, dedicated to archiving and displaying surfboards, surf art, memorabilia, surfing equipment, photographs, magazines, videos, and more.  The California Surf Museum's permanent time line of surfboards includes wooden boards from the early 1900s to today's modern boards.  The museum has rotating exhibits and is visited by an estimated 20,000 people annually.  It was founded in 1986 in Encinitas, California and subsequently moved to Pacific Beach before settling in Oceanside in 1991.  The current location (its third location in Oceanside) is a  building located in downtown Oceanside close to the pier. The museum hosts a number of events annually including a fundraising gala, three-day Surf Film Festival, "Legends Day", book signings, concerts and more.  The California Surf Museum is a 501(c)(3) non-profit organization.

The Museum features a display of many unique pieces of surfing memorabilia, including a display dedicated to Bethany Hamilton who lost her arm in a shark attack off the coast of Hawaii. The display includes the board that Hamilton was riding at the time with a large piece missing where the shark bit off Hamilton's arm, as well as the bathing suit she was wearing at the time, a gift from Ocean Photographer Aaron Chang.

Gallery

References

External links

Official website

Museums in San Diego County, California
Sports museums in California
Oceanside, California
Surfing museums